Sybra geminata is a species of beetle in the family Cerambycidae. It was described by Johann Christoph Friedrich Klug in 1833.

References

geminata
Beetles described in 1883